Jozef Maria August Antoon (Jef) Van den Eynde (21 December 1879 – 12 April 1929) was a prominent figure from Leuven's student life, an activist and member of the Council of Flanders during the First World War.

He made a valuable contribution as secretary of the linguistic society Met Tijd en Vlijt and of the Social Speakers Union (Dutch: Sociale Sprekersbond). He became president of the East Flemish student guild and founder-conductor of the student orchestra, in which he played the piano and violin himself. From 1901 to 1908 he was editor-in-chief of Ons Leven and president of the Vlaamsch Verbond.

During his many years as a perpetual student, he managed to leave a mark on student traditions and student life. His main goal was to bring the students to a higher cultural level. Many prominent Flemish leaders were invited by him to address the students, such as Frans Van Cauwelaert, Lodewijk Dosfel, René De Clercq, Stijn Streuvels, Karel Van de Woestijne, Hugo Verriest and many others. He also acted as a music patron. He campaigned for the launch of Flemish composers, such as Emiel Hullebroeck, Karel Mestdagh and Arthur Meulemans. He also composed and wrote several student songs, such as the Verbondslied of the Katholiek Vlaams Hoogstudentenverbond (KVHV). In 1907 he introduced the Flemish student cap, after the German model.

Successive generations of Leuven students honored his memory and elevated him to a legendary figure. Edmond de Goeyse (1907–1998) was very active in this and was regarded as his spiritual heir. In 1955 the KVHV even transferred his remains to Vlierbeek.

References

Further reading
 J. Grauls, Jef Van den Eynde, in: Ons Volk Ontwaakt, 28 April 1929.
 J. A. Spincemaille, Jef Van den Eynde herdacht, in: Roeping, July 1935.
 Ernest Claes, Leuven, o dagen, schone dagen, Leuven, 1959
 Louis Vos-Gevers, De Vlaamse studentenbeweging te Leuven, 1836-1914, in: Onze Alma Mater, 1975.
 Mon De Goeyse, O Vrij studentenheerlijkheid. Historische schetsen, Leuven, 1987
 Sandra Maes, Jef Van den Eynde, in: Nieuwe encyclopedie van de Vlaamse Beweging, Tielt, 1997.
 Huldenummers in Ons Leven: 1908, 1935 and 1955.
 Ernest Claes, Leuven, o dagen, schone dagen, 1959.
 H. Maes, Jef Van den Eynde, weeldekind en trekpaard van het Leuvense studentenleven, in: Bijdragen tot de geschiedenis van de stad Deinze, 1984.
 H. Maes, Jef Vanden Eynde, in: Nationaal Biografisch Woordenboek, Deel XIII, Brussels, 1990.
 Daniel Vanacker, Het aktivistisch avontuur, 1991.
 Flavie Roquet, Lexicon van Vlaamse componisten geboren na 1800, Roeselare, 2007.

1879 births
1929 deaths
Belgian activists
People from Zulte